Tevarit Majchacheep (born February 22, 1975) in Thailand, was the first 10 m Air Rifle shooter to raise a world record to the maximum level, hitting the 0.5-millimeter dot with 60 consecutive shots. He was fairly unknown to the shooting community (although he had finished fifth at an ISSF World Cup) when he accomplished this at the 2000 Asian Championships in Langkawi. Since then, he has been a regular finalist at world-level competitions, but has so far failed to win any of the large championships.

Since Tevarit's 600, several women have reached the maximum 400 points of their shorter Air Rifle match, but he remained the sole holder of the men's world record until 2008.

Olympic results

Records

External links 

 Tevarit's profile at ISSF NEWS

1975 births
Living people
Tevarit Majchacheep
ISSF rifle shooters
World record holders in shooting
Shooters at the 2000 Summer Olympics
Shooters at the 2004 Summer Olympics
Tevarit Majchacheep
Asian Games medalists in shooting
Shooters at the 1998 Asian Games
Shooters at the 2002 Asian Games
Shooters at the 2006 Asian Games
Shooters at the 2010 Asian Games
Shooters at the 2014 Asian Games
Tevarit Majchacheep
Tevarit Majchacheep
Tevarit Majchacheep
Medalists at the 1998 Asian Games
Tevarit Majchacheep
Tevarit Majchacheep
Southeast Asian Games medalists in shooting
Competitors at the 2007 Southeast Asian Games